Palio zosterae is a species of sea slug, a nudibranch, a shell-less marine gastropod mollusc in the family Polyceridae.

Distribution 
This species was described from Vancouver Island, British Columbia, Canada. It is found from Vancouver Island to Bodega Bay, California.

Ecology
Palio zosterae feeds on the bryozoans Bowerbankia gracilis and Membranipora membranacea.

References

Polyceridae
Gastropods described in 1924